Edward Pierce Mulrooney (July 24, 1874 – April 29, 1960) was the New York City Police Commissioner from 1930 to 1933. He then went on to become chairman of the State Alcoholic Beverage Control Board.

Biography
He was born on July 24, 1874 in New Jersey. He was the New York City Police Commissioner from 1930 to 1933. He then went on to become the first chairman of the State Alcoholic Beverage Control Board in 1933.
He died on April 30, 1960.

References

1874 births
1960 deaths
New York City Police Commissioners